Stewart Boswell (born 29 July 1978 in Canberra, Australian Capital Territory) is a professional squash player from Australia.

Career Overview

In 2003, Boswell had been ranked in the world's top-10 for two years and had reached a career-high ranking of World No. 4, when a mystery back ailment forced him to stop playing. He returned to the professional tour in 2005. On his return, he won six of the tour's lower-ranking tournaments in a row, and two further lower-ranking tournaments later in the year. He broke back into the world's top-20 in 2006 and the top-10 in 2007.

At the Commonwealth Games in 2002, Boswell won a bronze medal in the men's singles, and silver medal in the men's doubles partnering Anthony Ricketts. Boswell and Ricketts again won a men's doubles silver medal at the 2006 Commonwealth Games. The pair won the men's doubles title at the 2006 World Doubles Squash Championships.

After losing out to Grégory Gaultier during the 2011 Kuwait PSA Cup, Boswell announced he would retire from professional play.

Major World Series final appearances

US Open: 1 finals (0 title, 1 runner-up)

References

External links
Stewart Boswell retires, Nov 2011

Page at Squashpics

Australian male squash players
Living people
1978 births
Commonwealth Games silver medallists for Australia
Squash players at the 2006 Commonwealth Games
Sportspeople from Canberra
Squash players at the 2010 Commonwealth Games
Commonwealth Games medallists in squash
Competitors at the 2009 World Games
Medallists at the 2002 Commonwealth Games
Medallists at the 2006 Commonwealth Games
Medallists at the 2010 Commonwealth Games